Lanthanum iodide may refer to:

 Lanthanum diiodide, LaI2
 Lanthanum(III) iodide (lanthanum triiodide), LaI3